CODE may refer to:
 Crude Oil Data Exchange, an electronic business standard sanctioned by the American Petroleum Institute
 Cultural Olympiad Digital Edition
 Code (album), a 1987 album by Cabaret Voltaire, stylized as C O D E
 CODE University of Applied Sciences, a university in Berlin
 Confederation of Democracy (Confederación de la Democracia) (1972), a defunct political coalition in Chile
 Call of Duty Endowment

See also
 Code (disambiguation)